Balika Vadhu (English: The Child Bride) is an Indian soap opera that was aired on Colors TV between 21 July 2008 and 31 July 2016 with 2,248 episodes. The story is set in rural Rajasthan and revolves around the life of a child bride from childhood to womanhood.

The show consists of two parts. The first part, Balika Vadhu - Kacchi Umar Ke Pakke Rishte (English: Child Bride - Strong Relationships of Tender Age) which ran for 2,164 episodes, focused on Anandi and Jagdish, who were married in childhood. The second part, Balika Vadhu - Lamhe Pyaar Ke (English: Child Bride - Moments of Love) which ran for 84 episodes, reflects the life of Anandi's daughter, Dr. Nandini, also known as Nimboli, who was also a child bride. After airing for 8 years, the serial ended on 31 July 2016.

Plot
Balika Vadhu follows the lives of Anandi and Jagdish, who were married as children, and the challenges they and their families face over several decades.

Cast

Main

 Pratyusha Banerjee / Toral Rasputra as Anandi Khajaan Singh /Anandi Jagdish Singh/Anandi Shivraj Shekhar: Khajaan and Bhagwati's daughter; Jagdish's ex-wife; Shivraj's wife; Nandini and Shivam's mother; Amol's adoptive mother (2010–16)
 Avika Gor as Child Anandi Khajaan Singh/Anandi Jagdish Singh  (2008–10)
 Shashank Vyas / Shakti Anand as Dr. Jagdish "Jagya" Singh: Bhairon and Sumitra's son; Sugna's brother; Anandi and Gauri ex-husband; Ganga's husband; Mannu's step-father; Abhimanyu's father (2010–15) (2015–16)
 Avinash Mukherjee as Child Jagdish Singh  (2008–10)
 Sidharth Shukla as IAS Shivraj "Shiv" Shekhar: Anoop and Meenakshi's son; Alok and Iravati's nephew, Mahi brother, Sanchi's cousin brother; Anandi's second husband; Nandini and Shivam's father; Amol's adoptive father (2012–15)
 Mahhi Vij as Dr. Nandini Shekhar Malhotra: Anandi and Shivraj's daughter; Anoop and Meenakshi's grand-daughter; Mahi and Sanchi's niece; Naren and Jamuna's adopted daughter; Shivam's twin sister; Krish's wife (2016)
 Gracy Goswami as Child Nandini "Nimboli" Shekhar (2015–16)
 Ruslaan Mumtaz as Dr. Krish Malhotra: Kundan's step-son; Nandini's husband; Anandi and shiv' son-in-law (2016)
 Surekha Sikri as Kalyani Devi Singh – Dharamveer's widow; Bhairon's mother and Basant's aunt and Foster Mother; Jagdish and Sugna's  grandmother; Nandu and Bhairavi's foster grandmother; Abhimanyu, Varun and Shagun's great-grand mother (2008–16)
 Sriti Jha / Sargun Mehta / Aasiya Kazi as Ganga Ratan Singh / Ganga Jagdish Singh: Ratan's first wife; Jagdish's third wife; Mannu and Abhimanyu's mother (2013–15) (2015–16)
 Roshni Walia as Child Ganga Singh (2013)
 Anjum Farooki/Deblina Chatterjee as Dr. Gauri Singh :  Jagdish's ex- second wife (2010–12)/(2014)
 Mahima Makwana as Child Gauri Singh (2010)
 Anup Soni as Bhairon Singh: Dharamveer and Kalyani's son, Sumitra's husband; Jagdish and Sugna's father, Abhimanyu, Varun and Shagun's grandfather (2008–14)
 Smita Bansal as Sumitra Bhairon Singh: Bhairon's wife; Jagdish and Sugna's mother, Abhimanyu, Varun and Shagun's grandmother (2008–14)

Recurring
 Dishank Arora as Shivam Shekhar: Anandi and Shivraj's son; Anoop and Meenakshi's grandson, Mahi and Sanchi's nephew, Nandini's twin  brother; Sudha's husband (2016)
 Viren Vazirani as Child Shivam Shekhar (2015–2016)
 Vineet Kumar Chaudhary as Kundan Singh: Akhiraj and Harki's son; Kamli's brother; Urmila's former husband; Krish's step-father (2016)
 Sparsh Srivastav / Karan Pahwa as Young Kundan Singh (2015–2016) 
 Yukti Kapoor as Sudha Shekhar (ńee Shekhawat): Naren and Jamuna's daughter; Shivam's wife; Shivraj and Anandi's daughter-in-law(2016)
 Shahab Khan as Naren Shekhawat: Jamuna's husband; Nandini's adopted father; Sudha's father;Shivam's father-in-law (2016)
 Neetu Pandey as Jamuna Shekhawat: Naren's wife; Nandini's adopted mother; Sudha's mother;Shivam's mother-in-law (2016)
 Vibha Anand / Janvi Chheda as Sugna Singh: Bhairon and Sumitra's daughter; Jagdish's sister; Shyam's wife; Varun and Shagun's mother (2008–2010) (2011–2013)
 Vikrant Massey / Sachin Shroff as Shyam Singh: Madan's son; Sugna's husband; Varun's Foster father and Shagun's Father (2009–2010)/(2011–2013)
 Shivansh Kotia / Rudra Soni as Varun Singh: Pratap and Sugna's son; Shyam's Foster-son and Shagun's Brother (2010)/(2011–2013)
 Satyajit Sharma as Basant Dharamveer Singh /  Mahaveer Singh: Jamuna and Gehna husband, Nandu and Bhairvi father (2008–2014)
 Neha Marda / Sheetal Khandal as Gehna Basant Singh / Gehna Niranjan Singh: Basant former wife, Niranjan's wife,Nandu and Bhairvi mother (2008–12) (2012–15)
 Roop Durgapal as Sanchi Kabra (ńee Shekhar): Alok and Iravati's daughter; Shivraj and Mahi's sister; Vivek's wife (2012–2015)
 Jaineeraj Rajpurohit as Alok Shekhar: Premkishore's son; Anoop's brother; Iravati's husband; Sanchi's father, Shivraj and Mahi's uncle (2012–2015)
 Sonal Jha as Iravati Shekhar: Alok's wife; Sanchi's mother, Shivraj and Mahi aunt (2012–2015)
 Anita Kulkarni as Meenakshi Shekhar: Anoop's wife, Shivaraj and Mahi's mother, Sanchi's aunt,Shivam and Nandini's grand mother (2012–2015)
 Avinash Wadhawan / Akshay Anand as Anoop Shekhar: Premkishore's son; Meenakshi's husband, Shivraj and Mahi's father,
Sanchi's uncle,Shivam and Nandini's grand father (2013–2014)/(2014–2015)
 Shubham Jha as Amol Shekhar: Shivraj and Anandi's adopted son (2014-2015)
 Sanjay Basak as Nandkishore Basant Singh aka Nandu: Basant and Gehna son (2012–2015)
 Sunil Singh as Akhiraj Singh: Harki's husband; Kundan and Kamli's father (2015–2016)
 Rudrakshi Gupta as Harki Singh: Akhiraj's wife; Kundan and Kamli's mother (2015–2016)
 Farah Hussain as Kamli Singh: Akhiraj and Harki's daughter; Kundan's sister; Pushkar's wife (2015–2016)
 Tisha Kapoor as Urmila Singh: Kundan's former wife (2015)
 Sudhir Pandey as Premkishore Shekhar: Alok and Anoop father, Iravati and Meena father in-law, Shiv, Sanchi and Mahi grandfather, Nandini, Shivam great-grandfather (2012–2015)
 Sushmita Mukherjee as Subhadra: Premkishore's sister,Hardik's grandmother (2014–2015)
 Gaurav Bajaj as Hardik: Subhadra's grandson,Gulli's husband (2014)
 Nidhi Jha / Sonam Lamba as Gulli: Champa's daughter,Hardik's wife(2011–2013) (2014)
 Mohit Abrol as Anuj (2014)
 Vimarsh Roshan as Advocate Vivek Kabra: Roshan and Shalini's elder son,Saurabh and Rakhi's brother,Sanchi's husband (2013–2015)
 Sonal Handa as Saurabh Kabra: Roshan and Shalini's younger son,Vivek and Rakhi's brother,Sanchi's rapist and brother-in-law  (2013–2014)
 Bobby Parvez as Roshan Kabra: Shalini's husband,Vivek,Saurabh and Rakhi's father,Sanchi's father-in-law (2014)
 
 Shalini Arora as Shalini Kabra: Roshan's wife,Vivek,Saurabh and Rakhi's mother,Sanchi's mother-in-law (2014–2015)
 Farhina Parvez as Rakhi Kabra: Roshan and Shalini's daughter,Vivek and Saurabh's sister,Sanchi's sister-in-law(2014)
 Abhishek Tiwari as Mahi Anoop Shekhar-Anoop and Meenakahi's younger son; Shivraj's brother,Sanchi's cousin brother, Anandi's brother-in-law, Shivam & Nandini uncle (2012–2014)
 Reena Aggarwal as Ashima (2012–2013)
 Chandresh Singh as Ratan Singh (2013–2015)
 Amar Sharma as Madan Singh: Shyam's father (2008–2014)
 Abhijeet Lahiri as Ramcharan Singh (2009–2010)
 Asmita Sharma as Radha Singh: Madan's wife (2008–2010)
 Neha Gosain as Asha Singh (2011–2013)
 Ankit Gupta as Abhishek Singh (2012–2013)
 Rajeshwari Sachdev as Mangaladevi Singh / Disa (2015–2016)
 Rishidev Sharma as Gopal (2015)
 Rajendra Gupta as Mahaveer Singh (2009–2012)
 Parichay Sharma as Pushkar Singh: Kamli's husband (2015–2016)
 Hiten Tejwani as Dr. Anant Maheshwari: A Pediatric doctor; Kiran's father (2015–2016)
 Vidhi Pandya as Kiran Maheshwari: Anant's daughter (2015–2016)
 Chetanya Adib as Khajaan Singh: Bhagwati's husband; Anandi's father (2008–2015)
 Bhairavi Raichura as Bhagwati Singh: Khajaan's wife; Anandi's mother (2008–2012)
 Farida Jalal as Vasundhara Devi aka Badi Jiji / Badi Masiji (2009, 2012)
 Faiza Faiz / Mamta Chaturya as Phooli Singh (2008–10) (2010–2012)
 Arpit Joshi as Lal Singh (2010–2012)
 Masshe uddin Qureshi as Brijesh Sanghvi (2010–2012)
 Farnaz Shetty as Kanchan (2013)
 Nivedita Bhattacharya as Shivani Rajadhyaksha (2011; 2014)
 Harsh Chhaya as Palash Scindia (2014)
 Kamalika Guha Thakurta as Pramila (2014)
 Sadiya Siddiqui as Sandhya (2008–2013)
 Sakshi Tanwar as Tiipri (2010)
 Jehangir Vakil as Pratap Singh (2008–2009)
 Shivshakti Sachdev as Champa: Anandi's friend,Gulli's mother(2008)
 Geeta Tyagi as Jamuna Singh: Basant's first wife (2008)
 Karmveer Choudhary as Shambhu Singh
 Rahul Lohani as Niranjan Singh: Gehna's second husband, Nandu and Bhairavi's step-father(2009–2010; 2014–2015)
 Geetanjali Mishra as Sona / Kkusum (2014–2015)
 Simran Natekar as Pooja (2015)
 Harsh Mehta as Mahendra Singh aka Mannu: Ganga and Ratan's son; Jagdish's step-son; Abhimanyu's half-brother (2015–16)
 Sonia Shah as Karuna Malhotra (2016)
 Avinash Sachdev as Dr. Amit Goel (2016)
 Prithvi Sankhala as Dr. Naresh Goel (2016)
 Smriti Khanna as Dr. Vandana Mittal (2016)
 Ayush Anand as Premal Singh (2016)
 Hetal Yadav as Pavitra Singh (2016)

Crossover episodes

Sasural Simar Ka
Udaan

Trishakti
In each Trishakti cross-over, three serials were broken down into parts and aired successively.

Trishakti episodes

Adaptations

Reception

Ratings
Balika Vadhu became one of the most watched Hindi GEC in its runtime and is one of the shows which helped get newly launched channel Colors TV to the first position in Hindi GEC, beating the nine years top position maintained by Star Plus.

Balika Vadhu opened to a mix of positive and negative responses. While some appreciated it for portraying the issues of child marriage, some criticised it for glorifying child marriage. It had a very low initial rating of 0.7 TVR, but by five weeks after launch, it had entered the top 5 most-watched Hindi GEC and had become Colors TV's top programme.

In five weeks after launch, it entered the top 5 most-watched Hindi GEC. Thus, Balika Vadhu helped Colors TV's top positioning a lot. Balika Vadhu often held top position mostly on the ratings charts from 2008 to till 2013.

In 11 week of 2009, it occupied third position with 5.9 TVR. In week ending 13 June 2009, it was at fourth position with 5.3 TVR.

In week 11 of 2010, it occupied top position and garnered 7.7 TVR. In week 30 of 2010, it occupied with the top position with 6.9 TVR.

In week ending 28 May 2011, it occupied the top position with 4.91 TVR. In week 24 of 2011, it was at second position with 4.81 TVR. In first two weeks of August 2011, it garnered 6.1 and 5.2 TVRs maintaining its top position.

In the first week of 2012, it occupied the second position with 4.76 TVR. In week 50 of 2012, it was at top position with 5.8 TVR.
 
In last week of July 2013, it was at second position with 3.9 TVR.

Critics
The series received a mix of both positive and negative responses. While some applauded the series for portraying the issues of child marriage, which had never before been shown on Indian television, others criticized the series glorifying child marriage.

The series was also addressed in Indian Parliaments during 2009, prompting the Ministry of Information and Broadcasting to stop its telecast, condemning it for portraying child marriage against the Indian constitutional law.

Sequel
A reboot of the show named Balika Vadhu 2, aired on the same channel from 9 August 2021 to 29 March 2022.

Spin-off

An animated series, Chhoti Anandi, was launched in 2016. The show focuses on the adventures of an 8 years old Anandi and her friends. It was simulcasted on Colors TV and Rishtey from January to April 2016. The animation was provided by HopMotion animation studio.

References

External links
 

2008 Indian television series debuts
2016 Indian television series endings
Indian television soap operas
Colors TV original programming
Hindi-language television shows
Television shows set in Rajasthan
Child marriage in India
2000s Indian television series
2010s Indian television series
Television episodes about child marriage
Indian television shows